Pumawasi (Quechua puma cougar, puma, wasi house, "puma house", Hispanicized spellings  Pomaguasi, Pomahuasi, Pumaguasi, Pumahuasi) may refer to:

 Pumahuasi, a municipality in the Yavi Department, Jujuy Province, Argentina
 Pumahuasi District or Daniel Alomías Robles District, a district in the Huánuco Region, Peru
 Pumawasi, Anta, cave with pre-Columbian rock-art in the Anta Province, Cusco Region, Peru
 Pumawasi (Paruro), a mountain in the Paruro Province, Cusco Region, Peru